French India, formally the , was a French colony comprising five geographically separated enclaves on the Indian Subcontinent that had initially been factories of the French East India Company. They were de facto incorporated into the Republic of India in 1950 and 1954. The French also possessed several  ('lodges', tiny subsidiary trading stations) inside other towns, but after 1816, the British denied all French claims to these, which were not reoccupied.

In 1936, the population of the colony totalled 298,851 inhabitants, of which 63% (187,870) lived in the territory of Pondichéry.

Background 

France was the last of the major European maritime powers of the 17th century to enter the East India trade. Six decades after the foundation of the English and Dutch East India companies (in 1600 and 1602 respectively), and at a time when both companies were multiplying factories (trading posts) on the shores of India, the French still did not have a viable trading company or a single permanent establishment in the East.

Seeking to explain France's late entrance in the East India trade, historians cite geopolitical circumstances such as the inland position of the French capital, France's numerous internal customs barriers, and parochial perspectives of merchants on France's Atlantic coast, who had little appetite for the large-scale investment required to develop a viable trading enterprise with the distant East Indies.

History

Initial marine voyages to India (16th century) 
The first French commercial venture to India is believed to have taken place in the first half of the 16th century, in the reign of King Francis I, when two ships were fitted out by some merchants of Rouen to trade in eastern seas; they sailed from Le Havre and were never heard of again. In 1604, a company was granted letters patent by King Henry IV, but the project failed. Fresh letters patent were issued in 1615, and two ships went to India, only one returning.

La Compagnie française des Indes orientales (French East India Company) was formed under the auspices of Cardinal Richelieu (1642) and reconstructed under Jean-Baptiste Colbert (1664), sending an expedition to Madagascar.

First factory in India (1668) 
In 1667, the French India Company sent out another expedition, under the command of François Caron (who was accompanied by a Persian named Marcara), which reached Surat in 1668 and established the first French factory in India.

French expansion in India (1669-1672) 
In 1669, Marcara succeeded in establishing another French factory at Masulipatam. In 1672, Fort Saint Thomas was taken but the French were driven out by the Dutch after a long and costly siege. Chandernagore (present-day Chandannagar) was established in 1692, with the permission of Nawab Shaista Khan, the Mughal governor of Bengal. In 1673, the French acquired the area of Pondicherry from the qiladar of Valikondapuram under the Sultan of Bijapur, and thus the foundation of Pondichéry was laid. By 1720, the French had lost their factories at Surat, Masulipatam and Bantam to the British East India Company.

Establishment of colony at Pondichéry (1673) 
On 4 February 1673, Bellanger de l'Espinay, a French officer, took up residence in the Danish Lodge in Pondichéry, thereby commencing the French administration of Pondichéry. In 1674, François Martin, the first Governor, initiated ambitious projects to transform Pondichéry from a small fishing village into a flourishing port-town. The French, though, found themselves in continual conflict with the Dutch and the English. In 1693, the Dutch captured Pondichéry and augmented the fortifications. The French regained the town in 1699 through the Treaty of Ryswick, signed on 20 September 1697.

Establishment of colonies at Yanon (1723) and Karaikal (1739) 
From their arrival until 1741, the objectives of the French, like those of the British, were purely commercial. In the early 18th century, the town of Pondichéry was laid out on a grid pattern and grew considerably. Able governors like Pierre Christophe Le Noir (1726–1735) and Pierre Benoît Dumas (1735–1741) expanded the Pondichéry area and made it a large and rich town.

Ambition of establishment of French territorial empire in India and defeat (1741-1754) 
Soon after his arrival in 1741, the most famous governor of French India, Joseph François Dupleix, began to cherish the ambition of a French territorial empire in India in spite of the pronounced uninterested attitude of his distant superiors and of the French government, which didn't want to provoke the British. Dupleix's ambition clashed with British interests in India and a period of military skirmishes and political intrigues began and continued even in rare periods when France and Great Britain were officially at peace. Under the command of the Marquis de Bussy-Castelnau, Dupleix's army successfully controlled the area between Hyderabad and Cape Comorin. But then Robert Clive arrived in India in 1744, a British officer who dashed the hopes of Dupleix to create a French empire in India. 

After a defeat and failed peace talks, Dupleix was summarily dismissed and recalled to France in 1754.

French vs British intrigues (1754-1871) 
In spite of a treaty between the British and French agreeing not to interfere in regional Indian affairs, their colonial intrigues continued. The French expanded their influence at the court of the Nawab of Bengal and increased their trading activity in Bengal. In 1756, the French encouraged the Nawab (Siraj ud-Daulah) to attack and take the British Fort William in Calcutta. This led to the Battle of Plassey in 1757, where the British decisively defeated the Nawab and his French allies, resulting in the extension of British power over the entire province of Bengal.

Subsequently, France sent Lally-Tollendal to recover the lost French possessions and drive the British out of India. Lally arrived in Pondichéry in 1758, had some initial success and razed Fort St. David in Cuddalore District to the ground in 1758, but strategic mistakes by Lally led to the loss of the Hyderabad region, the Battle of Wandiwash and the siege of Pondicherry in 1760. In 1761, the British razed Pondichéry to the ground in revenge for the French depredations; it lay in ruins for four years. The French had lost their hold now in South India too.

In 1765, Pondichéry was returned to France in accordance with a 1763 peace treaty with Britain. Governor Jean Law de Lauriston set to rebuild the town on its former layout and after five months 200 European and 2000 Tamil houses had been erected. In 1769, the French East India Company, unable to support itself financially, was abolished by the French Crown, which assumed administration of the French possessions in India. During the next 50 years, Pondichéry changed hands between France and Britain with the regularity of their wars and peace treaties.

In 1816, after the conclusion of the Napoleonic Wars, the five establishments of Pondichéry, Chandernagore, Karaikal, Mahe and Yanam and the lodges at Machilipatnam, Kozhikode and Surat were returned to France. Pondichéry had lost much of its former glory, and Chandernagore dwindled into an insignificant outpost to the north of the rapidly growing British metropolis of Calcutta. Successive governors tried, with mixed results, to improve infrastructure, industry, law and education over the next 138 years.

By a decree of 25 January 1871, French India was to have an elective general council (conseil général) and elective local councils (conseil local). The results of this measure were not very satisfactory, and the qualifications for and the classes of the franchise were modified. The governor resided at Pondichéry and was assisted by a council. There were two Tribunaux d'instance (Tribunals of first instance) (at Pondichéry and Karikal) one Cour d'appel (Court of Appeal) (at Pondichéry) and five Juges de paix (Justices of the Peace). Agricultural production consisted of rice, peanuts, tobacco, betel nuts and vegetables.

Independence movement (18th-20th century) and merger with India (1954) 
The Independence of India on 15 August 1947 gave impetus to the union of France's Indian possessions with former British India. The lodges in Machilipatnam, Kozhikode and Surat were ceded to India on 6 October 1947. An agreement between France and India in 1948 agreed to an election in France's remaining Indian possessions to choose their political future. Governance of Chandernagore was ceded to India on 2 May 1950; it was then merged with West Bengal state on 2 October 1954. On 1 November 1954, the four enclaves of Pondichéry, Yanam, Mahe, and Karikal were de facto transferred to the Indian Union and became the Union Territory of Puducherry. The de jure union of French India with India did not take place until 1962 when the French Parliament in Paris ratified the treaty with India.

List of French establishments in India 
The French establishments of India are all located in the Indian peninsula. As of 1839, these establishments are

 On the Coramandel coast,
 Pondichéry and its territory comprising districts of Pondichéry, Villenour and Bahour;
 Karikal and its dependent maganams, or districts.
 On the coast of Orissa,
 Yanaon and its territory comprising dependent aldées or villages;
 The Masulipatam loge and a garden named Francepeth.
 On the Malabar coast,
 Mahé and its territory;
 The Calicut loge.
 In Bengal,
 Chandernagor and its territory;
 The five loges of Cassimbazar, Jougdia, Dacca, Balasore and Patna.
 In Gujarat, 
 Surat factory.

Under the French East India Company's regime, the name 'loge' was given to factories or insulated establishments consisting of a home with an adjacent ground, where France had the right to fly its flag and form trading posts.

List of chief governing officers

Commissioners 
 François Caron, 1668–1672
 François Baron, 1672–1681
 François Martin, 1681 – November 1693
 Dutch occupation, September 1693 – September 1699 — Treaty of Ryswick (1697)

Governors 
In the days of the French East India Company, the title of the top official was most of the time Governor of Pondicherry and General Commander of the French settlements in the East Indies. After 1816, it was Governor of French establishments in India.
 François Martin, September 1699 – 31 December 1706
 Pierre Dulivier (Acting), January 1707 – July 1708
 Guillaume André d'Hébert, 1708–1712
 Pierre Dulivier, 1713–1715
 Guillaume André d'Hébert, 1715–1718
 Pierre André Prévost de La Prévostière, August 1718 – 11 October 1721
 Pierre Christoph Le Noir (Acting), 1721–1723
 Joseph Beauvollier de Courchant, 1723–1726
 Pierre Christoph Le Noir, 1727–1734
 Pierre Benoît Dumas, 1735–1741
 Joseph François Dupleix, 14 January 1742 – 15 October 1754
 Charles Godeheu, Le commissaire (Acting), 15 October 1754 – 1754
 Georges Duval de Leyrit, 1756–1758
 Thomas Arthur, comte de Lally, 1758 – January 1761
 First British occupation, January 15, 1761 – June 25, 1765 — Treaty of Paris (1763)
 Jean Law de Lauriston, 1765–1766
 Antoine Boyellau (Acting), 1766–1767
 Jean Law de Lauriston, 1767 – January 1777
 Second British occupation, 1778 – 1783 – Treaty of Paris (1783)
 Guillaume de Bellecombe, seigneur de Teirac, January 1777 – 1778
 Charles Joseph Pâtissier, Marquis de Bussy-Castelnau, 1783–1785
 François, Vicomte de Souillac, 1785
 David Charpentier de Cossigny, October 1785 – 1787
 Thomas, comte de Conway, October 1787 – 1789
 Camille Charles Leclerc, chevalier de Fresne, 1789–1792
 Dominique Prosper de Chermont, November 1792 – 1793
 L. Leroux de Touffreville, 1793
 Third British occupation, 23 August 1793 – 18 June 1802 — Treaty of Amiens (1802)
 Charles Matthieu Isidore, Comte Decaen, 18 June 1802 – August 1803
 Louis François Binot, 1803
 Fourth British occupation, August 1803 – 26 September 1816 — Treaty of Paris (1814)
 André Julien Comte Dupuy, 26 September 1816 – October 1825
 Joseph Cordier, Marie Emmanuel (Acting), October 1825 – 19 June 1826
 Eugène Desbassayns de Richemont, 1826 – 2 August 1828
 Joseph Cordier, Marie Emmanuel (Acting), 2 August 1828 – 11 April 1829
 Auguste Jacques Nicolas Peureux de Mélay, 11 April 1829 – 3 May 1835
 Hubert Jean Victor, Marquis de Saint-Simon, 3 May 1835 – April 1840
 Paul de Nourquer du Camper, April 1840 – 1844
 Louis Pujol, 1844–1849
 Hyacinthe Marie de Lalande de Calan, 1849–1850
 Philippe Achille Bédier, 1851–1852
 Raymond de Saint-Maur, August 1852 – April 1857
 Alexandre Durand d'Ubraye, April 1857 – January 1863
 Napoléon Joseph Louis Bontemps, January 1863 – June 1871
 Antoine-Léonce Michaux, June 1871 – November 1871
 Pierre Aristide Faron, November 1871 – 1875
 Adolph Joseph Antoine Trillard, 1875–1878
 Léonce Laugier, February 1879 – April 1881
 Théodore Drouhet, 1881 – October 1884
 Étienne Richaud, October 1884 – 1886
 Édouard Manès, 1886–1888
 Georges Jules Piquet, 1888–1889
 Louis Hippolyte Marie Nouet, 1889–1891
 Léon Émile Clément-Thomas, 1891–1896
 Louis Jean Girod, 1896 – February 1898
 François Pierre Rodier, February 1898 – 11 January 1902
 Louis Pelletan (Acting), 11 January 1902
 Victor Louis Marie Lanrezac, 1902–1904
 Philema Lemaire, August 1904 – April 1905
 Joseph Pascal François, April 1905 – October 1906
 Gabriel Louis Angoulvant, October 1906 – 3 December 1907
 Adrien Jules Jean Bonhoure, 1908–1909
 Ernest Fernand Lévecque, 1909 – 9 July 1910
 Alfred Albert Martineau, 9 July 1910 – July 1911
 Pierre Louis Alfred Duprat, July 1911 – November 1913
 Alfred Albert Martineau, November 1913 – 29 June 1918
 Pierre Étienne Clayssen (Acting), 29 June 1918 – 21 February 1919
 Louis Martial Innocent Gerbinis, 21 February 1919 – 11 February 1926
 Henri Léo Eugène Lagroua (Acting), 11 February 1926 – 5 August 1926
 Pierre Jean Henri Didelot, 1926–1928
 Robert Paul Marie de Guise, 1928–1931
 François Adrien Juvanon, 1931–1934
 Léon Solomiac, August 1934 – 1936
 Horace Valentin Crocicchia, 1936–1938
 Louis Alexis Étienne Bonvin, 26 September 1938 – 1945
 Nicolas Ernest Marie Maurice Jeandin, 1945–1946
 Charles François Marie Baron, 20 March 1946 – 20 August 1947

French India became an Overseas territory of France in 1946.

Commissioners 
 Charles François Marie Baron, 20 August 1947 – May 1949
 Charles Chambon, May 1949 – 31 July 1950
 André Ménard, 31 July 1950 – October 1954
 Georges Escargueil, October 1954 – 1 November 1954

French India de facto transferred to the Republic of India in 1954.

High Commissioners 

The first High Commissioner, Kewal Singh was appointed immediately after the Kizhoor referendum on 21 October 1954 as per Foreign Jurisdiction Act, 1947. The Chief Commissioner had the powers of the former French commissioner, but was under the direct control of the Union Government.

The list of Chief Commissioners is given below

See also 

 Apostolic Prefecture of French Colonies in India (Catholic mission)
 British Raj
 Colonial India
 Coup d'état of Yanaon
 Danish India
 Dutch India
 Municipal administration in French India
 Portuguese India

Notes

References

Bibliography 
 Sudipta Das (1992). Myths and realities of French imperialism in India, 1763–1783. New York: P. Lang. . 459pp.

External links

Frenchbooksonindia.com, an open access multilingual discovery tool with book data from 1531 to 2020, full-text ebooks from 1531 to 1937 and in-text search from c. 1830 to c. 1920
 V. Sankaran, Freedom struggle in Pondicherry – Gov't of India publication

 
1769 establishments in French India
1954 disestablishments in French India
States and territories established in 1769
States and territories disestablished in 1954
Colonial India
Colonial Kerala
Former colonies in Asia
Former countries in South Asia
France–India relations